Education Without Borders may refer to:
 Education Without Borders (Canadian organization)
 Education Without Borders (Spanish organization)
 Education Without Borders (Sudan)